Costello may refer to:

Places
Costello, Northern Territory, Australia
Costello Athletic Center, a multi-purpose arena in Lowell, Massachusetts, United States
Costello (barony), County Mayo, Ireland
Casla (Costelloe in English), a village in County Galway, Ireland

Music
Costello (band), an American melodic punk/power pop band
Costello Music, an album by Scottish rock band The Fratellis
Costello & Nieve, a 1996 live album by Elvis Costello and Steve Nieve
, Finnish musical band fronted by Costello Hautamäki

Others
17024 Costello (1999 EJ5), main-belt asteroid
Costello (surname)
Costello (TV series), American television sitcom
Costello Hautamäki (born 1963), Finnish singer and musician

See also
 
 Costel